Sukh Sanghera is a Canadian film and music video director associated with Punjabi-language films and music. He has directed over 300 Punjabi music videos. He has been nominated for various awards at PTC Punjabi Music Awards, winning one for his music video Diary sung by Amrinder Gill. In 2019, he directed Laiye Je Yaarian, for which he received PTC nomination for Best Debut Director.

Early life and career 
Sanghera hails from village Buzrag, Ludhiana. In 2007, he shifted to Canada and joined the trucking business. Before become director Sanghera has also modelled for more than 70 Punjabi songs. The first video he directed was for his friend and in an interview said, “I learned each and everything from YouTube.” In 2010, he founded an entertainment company 10+1 Creations Limited which has 11 members. As of 2019, he has directed over 300 music videos.

Sanghera started his film career in 2016 with the film Love Punjab, in which he served as line producer in Canadian schedule. Similarly in 2018, he served as Assistant Director and line producer in the film Ashke. In 2019, he made his directorial debut with the film Laiye Je Yaarian produced by Rhythm Boyz Entertainment.

Till now Sukh Sanghera has directed over 1000 videos and has worked with almost every punjabi singers . He directed many videos of big artists such as Karan Aujla, Garry Sandhu, Amrinder Gill, Mankirt Aulakh,  Gippy Grewal , Sidhu Moosewala,  Babbu Maan etc . He  directs the videos  mostly in Canada only .

In 2021, he announced his first film as writer named "Filma Wale" also directed by himself.

Selected music videos 
 Khat  - Babbu Maan
 Samundar - Babbu Maan
 Pendu - Amrinder Gill
 Diary - Amrinder Gill
 Supna - Amrinder Gill
 Don’t Worry - Karan Aujla
 Chitta Kurta - Karan Aujla
Kya Baat Aa - Karan Aujla  Ft. Tania
Let Em Play - Karan Aujla 
Yaariyan Ch Fikk - Karan Aujla
Rim V Jhanjhar- Karan Aujla
Hair - Karan Aujla
Ik Saal - Jassie Gill
 Gangland - Mankirt Aulakh
 Badnam - Mankirt Aulakh
 Kadar - Mankirt Aulakh
Jail - Mankirat Aulakh 
Kamli - Mankirt Aulakh 
Khayal - Mankirt Aulakh 
Daang - Mankirt Aulakh
 Dard  - Babbu Maan
 Banda Ban Ja - Garry Sandhu
Door - Garry Sandhu
Illegal Weapon - Garry Sandhu & Jasmine Sandlas
 Tareyan De Des - Prabh Gill
 Tankha - Ranjit Bawa
 Sohne Mukhde - Sharry Mann
 Kaali Camaro - Amrit Maan
 Guerilla War - Amrit Maan
 Aa Geya Ni Ohi Billo Time - Deep Jandu
 Good Life - Deep Jandu
 Rang Sanwla - Arsh Benipal
 Nose Pin - Jass Bajwa
 Diamond - Gurnam Bhullar
 Gangster Scene - Gursewak Dhillon
Scratch - Gursewak Dhillon 
 Kho Na Baithan - Kulwinder Billa
 Company - Gur Sidhu
 Manke - Jassa Dhillon
 Lowrider - Jassa Dhillon
 Majha Block'' - Prem Dhillon
Above All - Jassa Dhillon , Gur Sidhu
Raule - Jassa Dhillon 
Vaddi Galbaat - Gur Sidhu
US - Sidhu Moose Wala
Brown Shortie - Sidhu Moose Wala Ft . Sonam Bajwa
G-Shit - Sidhu Moose Wala
IDGAF - Sidhu Moose Wala Ft. Morrisson
Power - Sidhu Moose Wala
GOAT - Sidhu Moose Wala
2 Seater - Gippy Grewal 
Vigad Gaya - Gippy Grewal 
Stranger - Diljit Dosanjh
Impress - Ranjit Bawa
Uche Uche Kadd - Babbal Rai
Kalla Changa - Ninja
Rukh - Akhil
Rang Gora - Akhil 
Double Cross - Ammy Virk
Hassiyan Khediyan - Ammy Virk
Kaali Hummer - Maninder Buttar 
Oh Kithe - Kamal Khan  
Main Tan Vi Pyaar Karda - Happy Raikoti Ft. Millind
Taakre - Gur Sidhu ft. Jassa Dhillon
Goli - Gur Sidhu

Filmography

Awards and nominations

See also 
Rahul Chahal
Navi Lubana

References

Punjabi-language film directors
People from Ludhiana district
Canadian music video directors
Year of birth missing (living people)
Living people